Belgian supercentenarians are citizens, residents or emigrants from Belgium who have attained or surpassed 110 years of age. The Gerontology Research Group (GRG) has validated the longevity claims of 20 Belgian supercentenarians, including 18 residents and 2 emigrants.

The oldest known Belgian person was Joanna Deroover, who died in 2002 aged 112 years 186 days. The oldest Belgian man ever was Jan Machiel Reyskens, who lived 111 years and 241 days from 1878 to 1990.

Oldest Belgian people ever 
The list including known and validated supercentenarians who died before 2015 was compiled by the Gerontology Research Group (GRG). Later cases were sourced either from more recent GRG data, from administrative reports or from press coverage, as indicated in the table.

Notes

References 

Belgian centenarians
Belgian